= Arco de Isabel II =

Triumphal arch in Córdoba, Spain

Coordinates: 37°53′06″N 4°46′01″W

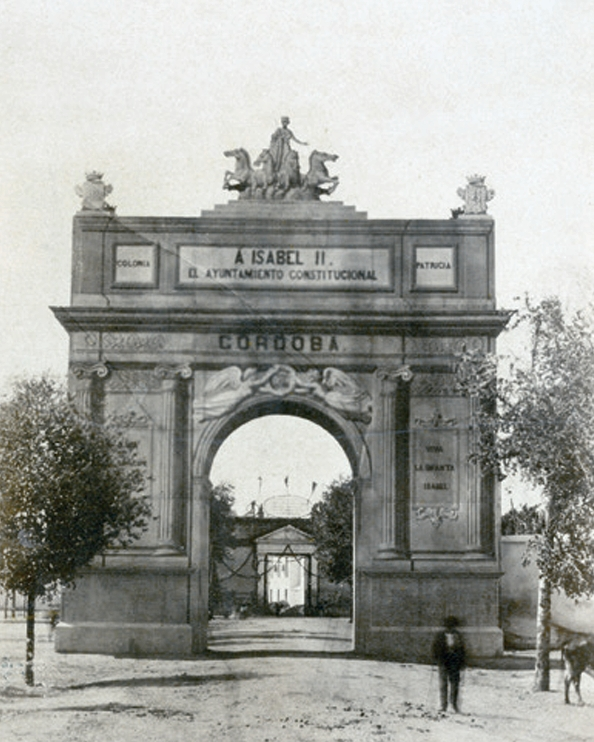
The Arch of Isabel II

The Arch of Isabel II (in Spanish el Arco de Isabel II) was an ephemeral triumphal arch, now disappeared, located in Córdoba, Spain. This commemorative monument was built in front of the old Puerta Nueva in 1862. The reason for its construction was to welcome the arrival of Queen Isabel II to the city of Cordoba, which took place on September 14, 1862. After the Queen's visit, the arch was abandoned and later dismantled.
